E. darwinii may refer to:

 Eugenia darwinii
 Eustephia darwinii

See also
 E. darwini (disambiguation)
 Darwinii (disambiguation)